Interleukin-26 (IL-26) is a protein that in humans is encoded by the IL26 gene.

IL-26 is the most recently identified member of the IL-20 cytokine subfamily, which was formed according to the usage of common receptor subunits and similarities in target-cell profiles and functions. All cytokines belonging to this subfamily are members of the larger IL-10 family. IL-26 is expressed in certain herpesvirus-transformed T cells but not in primary stimulated T cells. IL-26 signals through a receptor complex comprising two distinct proteins called IL-20 receptor 1 and IL-10 receptor 2. By signaling through this receptor complex, IL-26 induces rapid phosphorylation of the transcription factors STAT1 and STAT3, which enhance IL-10 and IL-8 secretion and as expression of the CD54 molecule on the surface of epithelial cells.

Gene organization and protein structure 
The IL26 gene is conserved in various vertebrates, but it is curiously absent in mice and rats. Paralogs of this gene have been identified in several non-mammalian species. The human gene is located on chromosome 12 (12q15), between the genes encoding IL-22 and IFNγ, and composed of five exons separated by three introns. This genomic cluster of genes encoding IL-22, IL-26, and IFNγ is present among all vertebrates.

IL-26 is a 171-amino acid protein that exhibits six alpha helices connected by loops and four conserved cysteine residues. Endogenous IL-26 is expressed as a 36 kDa homodimer. Originally named AK155, IL-26 was categorized in the IL-10 cytokine family due to sequence homology and secondary structure similarities.

Expression 
The IL-26 expression was initially discovered in human HVS-transformed T cells. Since then it was confirmed that T helper 1 cells and Th17 memory CD4+ cells are the major sources of IL-26. More accurately, IL-26 is expressed by pro-inflammatory IL-17 producing T cells in chronically inflamed tissues. Co-expression of IL-17, IL-22, and IL-26 de facto defines the phenotype of human Th17 cells. Furthermore, CD26+ CD4+ T cells produce IL-26 in a model of graft-versus-host disease (GvHD). CD4+ T cells polarized toward a regulatory phenotype (Treg), naïve CD4+ T cells, and T helper 2 cells show low or no expression of IL-26.

It remains unclear whether IL-26 monocytes and macrophages express IL-26. Some studies showed there is no expression, whereas other studies inconsistently reported constitutive expression at a low level in monocytes, and the secretion of IL-26 by lung alveolar macrophages locally exposed to endotoxin. The IL-26 expression is also present in NK cells, especially NKp44+ human NK cell subset localized in mucosa-associated lymphoid tissue express substantial amounts of IL-26. Very low IL-26 expression was reported in human herpesvirus 8-transformed B cells.

Regarding non-immune cells, IL-26 expression was detected in primary bronchial epithelial cells from healthy individuals. Pathologically, fibroblasts harvested from the inflamed synovia of patients with rheumatoid arthritis constituted the main source of IL-26.

Receptors 
IL-26R heterodimer, a conventional receptor for IL-26, consists of two chains – IL-10R2, and IL-20R1. The IL-20R1 subunit contains the IL-26-binding site, whereas the IL-10R2 subunit acts as a second chain completing the assembly. Experiments performed with epithelial cells suggested both receptor subunits are required for the IL-26-dependent signal transduction. According to some observations, there is a possibility that additional IL-26 receptors exist.

Ligand binding by functional IL-26 receptor complex results in the initiation of a signal transduction pathway involving receptor-associated Janus tyrosine kinases Jak1 and Tyk2. IL-20R1 interacts with Jak1, and IL-10R2 is associated with Tyk2. Ligand-induced heterodimerization of receptor chains promotes cross-activation of Janus kinases, which phosphorylate receptor intracellular domains, leading to the activation of STAT protein family intracellular transcription factors STAT1 and STAT3. In addition, IL-26 activates extracellular signal-regulated kinases (ERK)-1/2, c-Jun N-terminal kinase (JNK), mitogen-activated protein kinases (MAPKs), and protein kinase B (PKB).

While IL-10R2 is expressed on a wide variety of tissues, the expression of IL-20R1 is limited only to some tissues. Thus, the ability to respond to IL-26 is restricted by the expression of IL-20R1 subunit.

Role
Interleukin 26 (IL-26) is an inflammatory mediator and a driver of chronic inflammation due to its ability to act as a carrier of extracellular DNA, and as an antimicrobial molecule through its capacity to form pores in bacterial membranes. These properties suggest that IL-26 can be categorized as a kinocidin.

IL-26 is a natural human antimicrobial that promotes immune sensing of bacterial and host cell death. IL-26 is a cationic amphipathic protein that kills extracellular bacteria via membrane-pore formation. Furthermore, Th17 cell–derived IL-26 formed complexes with bacterial DNA and self-DNA released by dying bacteria and host cells. The IL-26–DNA complexes triggered the production of type I interferon by plasmacytoid dendritic cells via activation of Toll-like receptor 9, but independently of the IL-26 receptor. Monocytes infected with intracellular bacterium M. tuberculosis reacted by decreasing IL-26 production, and IL-26 serum concentrations were lower in tuberculosis patients. These data indicate that IL-26 may be involved in host defense against bacteria in more ways.

Concerning host defense to viruses, the role of IL-26 appears to be related to the expression of IL-26R by epithelial cells as these constitute the first barrier against many viruses. Elevated serum levels of IL-26 were detected in patients with chronic infection by hepatitis C virus. Moreover, the sensitivity of NK cells to IL-26 might trigger the ability to kill the virus-infected host cells.

So far, the role of IL-6 in acute inflammation has not been properly studied, and most biological functions of IL-26 have been identified in pathological situations that feature chronic inflammation. The expression of IL-26 is elevated in the inflamed colonic mucosa of patients with Crohn's disease and it was reported that IL-26 induces the expression of IL-8 and TNFα as well as IL-10 in human gut epithelial cells. This activation of epithelial cells involves STAT1 and/or STAT3. IL26 gene is also over-expressed in the joints of patients with spondyloarthritis and rheumatoid arthritis, in the sera and lesional skin tissues of psoriasis patients, and in the sera of multiple sclerosis patients.

A novel effect of IL-26 produced by donor-derived CD26+ CD4+ T cells on the pathophysiology of pulmonary chronic GVHD was observed in a murine model.  

The roles of IL-26 in normal physiology remain unknown. By contrast to other IL-10 cytokine family members, no induction of primary human keratinocyte proliferation in response to IL-26 has been detected.

References

Further reading 

 
 
 
 
 
 
 
 
 
 
 
 

Interleukins